The Dead Don't Die is a 2019 American absurdist zombie comedy film written and directed by Jim Jarmusch. It features an ensemble cast including Bill Murray, Adam Driver, Chloë Sevigny, Steve Buscemi, Tilda Swinton, Tom Waits, Danny Glover, Caleb Landry Jones, Rosie Perez, Iggy Pop, Carol Kane, Austin Butler and Selena Gomez and follows a small town's police force as they combat a sudden zombie invasion.

The film had its world premiere as the opening film at the Cannes Film Festival on May 14, 2019. It was theatrically released in North America on June 14, 2019 by Focus Features, and earned $15.3 million at the box office. It received mixed reviews from critics.

Plot
In rural Centerville, police officers Cliff Robertson and Ronnie Peterson respond to a report from farmer Frank Miller regarding a missing chicken, and briefly interact with Hermit Bob, a bearded eccentric, in the woods. On their way back to the station, Cliff notices there is still daylight after 8pm and Ronnie's watch and cell phone stop working. Later, at a diner, hardware store owner Hank Thompson hears a radio report concerning polar fracking.

Two zombies reanimate when night falls and kill the two diner employees, Fern and Lily, who are discovered by Hank the next morning. Ronnie believes zombies killed the employees. Young travelers Zoe, Jack and Zack stop for gas and meet Bobby.

At the Centerville Juvenile Detention Center, Geronimo tells fellow inmates Olivia and Stella that polar fracking has altered the Earth's rotation.

Cliff and Ronnie find open graves at the cemetery, while Hermit Bob spies on them. Cliff emphatically rejects Ronnie's suggestion of informing Miller of the general suspicion that zombies are on the loose. Ronnie teaches Cliff how to kill zombies, and Bobby and Hank prepare weapons. Motel owner Danny Perkins watches news about pets behaving strangely and then finds out his cats are missing. Other of Farmer Miller's animals have disappeared.

That evening, more zombies rise, and Danny is attacked and transformed. Cliff and Ronnie bring supplies to the station and tell fellow officer Mindy Morrison about the zombies. The corpse of Mallory reanimates in the police station and Ronnie decapitates her.

Two corpses reanimate at the funeral home and are beheaded by Zelda Winston (who recently bought the funeral home) with a sword. She goes to the police station, where the three officers leave her to operate communications. The cops drive through town and find the three travelers dead at the motel. Ronnie beheads the bodies, much to Mindy's distress, and takes Zoe's Sturgill Simpson CD. Zelda waves her hand over the police computer and it generates code. Ronnie begins playing the CD on the police car sound system, but Cliff throws the CD out the car window.

Hank and Bobby face zombies at the hardware store. Each zombie says only one word, related to something from their past or an item they see as a zombie. Zombies maul Miller. Geronimo, Olivia and Stella flee the detention center, again observed by Hermit Bob. When zombies overwhelm the patrol car at the cemetery, Mindy sees her dead grandmother, and exits the car, only to be engulfed by zombies. Ronnie and Cliff tell each other to shut up. Ronnie says he knew all would end badly because Jim gave him the entire script ahead of time, while Cliff only got the pages for his own scenes.

Zelda drives Ronnie's car through town, stopping to behead one last Fashion Zombie, and then walks calmly through the cemetery with sword in hand. Zombies amble away from the patrol car as a spinning UFO appears over the cemetery. Cliff and Ronnie watch as it beams up Zelda and departs. The two leave the car, and kill zombies including Bobby, Miller, Hank and Mindy. Hermit Bob watches from the woods through binoculars, lamenting how the world is a terrible place, as zombies overwhelm Cliff and Ronnie.

Cast
 Bill Murray as Chief Cliff Robertson: A police officer who resides in Centerville
 Adam Driver as Officer Ronnie Peterson: Cliff's partner and fellow police officer
 Tilda Swinton as Zelda Winston: a eccentric Scottish resident of Centerville who has recently bought the Funeral Home
 Chloë Sevigny as Officer Mindy Morrison: A fellow police officer who works with Cliff and Ronnie
 Steve Buscemi as Farmer Frank Miller: A farmer and resident of Centerville
 Danny Glover as Hank Thompson: The hardware store owner and resident of Centerville
 Caleb Landry Jones as Bobby Wiggins: the gas station attendant and toy shop owner. 
 Selena Gomez as Zoe: a young traveler 
 Austin Butler as Jack: a young traveler, who travels alongside Zoe and Zack
 Luka Sabbat as Zack: a young traveler, who travels alongside Zoe and Jack
 Rosie Perez as Posie Juarez: A news anchor and reporter
 Eszter Balint as Fern: a waitress at the local diner
 Iggy Pop as Male Coffee Zombie
 Sara Driver as Female Coffee Zombie
 RZA as Dean: a delivery worker who has a friendship with Bobby
 Carol Kane as Mallory O'Brien: The town drunk
 Larry Fessenden as Danny Perkins: The motel owner in Centerville
 Rosal Colon as Lily: a waitress at the local diner
 Sturgill Simpson as Guitar Zombie 
 Jodie Markell as Woman on TV
 Charlotte Kemp Muhl as Fashion Zombie
 Maya Delmont as Stella: an inmate at the Juvenile Detention Center
 Taliyah Whitaker as Olivia: a fellow inmate at the Juvenile Detention Center
 Jahi Winston as Geronimo: A fellow inmate at Juvenile Detention Center
 Tom Waits as Hermit Bob: a mysterious hermit who oversees Centerville's events play out
 Jonah Marshall as Zombie Child

Production
In February 2018, during the press tour for Isle of Dogs, Bill Murray and Tilda Swinton announced their involvement in a zombie film directed by Jim Jarmusch.

In March 2018, Murray announced that Daniel Craig and Rosie Perez were set to costar. Speaking of the project, Murray stated:

In July 2018, it was announced that Adam Driver, Selena Gomez, Chloë Sevigny, Austin Butler, Steve Buscemi, Tilda Swinton, and Caleb Landry Jones had been cast alongside Murray, though Craig did not appear in the film. Joshua Astrachan and Carter Logan produced the movie, while Focus Features distributes.

Filming took place in and around small communities north of New York City, including Ancram, Elizaville, Fleischmanns and Margaretville, New York.

Release
The Dead Don't Die had its world premiere as the opening film at the Cannes Film Festival on May 14, 2019. The film was released in the United States on June 14, 2019 and on July 12, 2019 in the United Kingdom. The studio spent $2–3 million on domestic promotion.

Reception

Box office
The Dead Don't Die has grossed $6.5 million in North America and $8.7 million in other territories for a worldwide total of $15.3 million.

In its opening weekend, the film grossed $2.4 million from 613 theaters.

Critical response
The site's critical consensus reads: "The Dead Don't Die dabbles with tones and themes to varying degrees of success, but sharp wit and a strong cast make this a zom-com with enough brains to consume." Metacritic assigned the film a weighted average score of 53 out of 100, based on 52 critics, indicating "mixed or average reviews".

Alex Leininger of PopMatters wrote "It's a curious film, one that acknowledges the end of the world blatantly without once forgetting to be steadfastly, almost dementedly, silly. It's a smart if minor work from a masterfully innovative director." In a review for The New York Times, A. O. Scott wrote that "The Dead Don't Die respects the horror genre without really committing to it."

Todd McCarthy, writing for The Hollywood Reporter, said of the film "At times, the deadpan of Murray and Driver becomes, well, a bit deadening, and true wit is in short supply, even though the film remains amusing most of the way."

References

External links
 
 
 
 
 

2019 films
2019 comedy horror films
2010s American films
2010s English-language films
American zombie comedy films
Films directed by Jim Jarmusch
Films set in Pennsylvania
Focus Features films
Parodies of horror
Self-reflexive films